The Leșu is a left tributary of the river Ilva in Romania. It discharges into the Ilva near the village Leșu.

References

Rivers of Romania
Rivers of Bistrița-Năsăud County